The Battle of Entzheim, also called Enzheim, or Ensheim, took place on 4 October 1674, during the 1672 to 1678 Franco-Dutch War. It was fought near the town of Entzheim, south of Strasbourg in Alsace, between a French army under Turenne, and an Imperial force commanded by Alexander von Bournonville.

In this campaign, Turenne compensated for being outnumbered by his aggression and vastly superior logistics, which allowed him to move fast and keep his opponents off balance. Despite a strong defensive position and vastly superior numbers, Bournonville decided to retreat after a series of French assaults.

Although his losses were significantly higher as a percentage of his army, Turenne prevented Bournonville invading Eastern France and the battle is generally regarded as inconclusive. However, the French established a psychological advantage, setting the scene for Turenne's Winter Campaign, often viewed as his greatest military achievement.

Background

Both France and the Dutch Republic viewed the Spanish Netherlands as essential for their security and trade, making it a contested area throughout the 17th century. Large parts of it were occupied by French troops in the 1667 to 1668 War of Devolution, before Louis XIV of France was obliged to return it to Spain in the 1668 Treaty of Aix-la-Chapelle. After this, Louis decided the best way to force the Dutch to agree territorial concessions in the Spanish Netherlands was by first defeating them.

When the Franco-Dutch War began in May 1672, French troops quickly over-ran much of the Republic, but by July the Dutch position had stabilised. In addition, the unexpected success of his offensive encouraged Louis to make excessive demands, while concern at French gains brought the Dutch support from Brandenburg-Prussia, Emperor Leopold, and Charles II of Spain. In August 1673, the French army in the Rhineland under Turenne was faced by Imperial forces under Raimondo Montecuccoli who outmanoeuvred his opponent and helped the Dutch in capture Bonn. Facing war on multiple fronts, Louis relinquished most of his earlier gains to consolidate his position along the French border with the Spanish Netherlands and in the Rhineland.

In January 1674, Denmark joined the anti-French coalition, followed by the February Treaty of Westminster, which ended the Third Anglo-Dutch War. The allies agreed to focus on expelling France from its remaining positions in the Netherlands, while an Imperial army opened a second front in Alsace. Louis appointed Turenne commander in Alsace and ordered him to prevent the Imperials breaking into Eastern France, or linking up with the Dutch. Since he could not expect reinforcements, the longer Turenne delayed, the worse his position became, and so he decided to take the offensive. He was helped in this since French armies of the period held significant advantages over their opponents; undivided command, talented generals, and vastly superior logistics. Reforms introduced by Louvois, the Secretary of War, meant they could mobilise much more quickly than their adversaries, and campaign for longer.

This flexibility allowed Turenne to attack his opponents individually, and at Sinsheim on 16 June, he inflicted heavy casualties on a detachment under Aeneas de Caprara, although he was unable to prevent him linking up with Bournonville. In August 1674, the French army in Flanders defeated a combined Dutch-Imperial army at Seneffe; while this relieved pressure on their northern border, losses were so heavy they shocked the court. In early September, 40,000 Imperial troops under Bournonville and Caprara entered Alsace by crossing the Rhine at Strasbourg, which was then part of the Holy Roman Empire. Having done so, Bournonville moved onto Entzheim to await another 20,000 troops led by Frederick William, Elector of Brandenburg, giving him a combined force that would allow him to overwhelm the French. Turenne decided to attack before these reinforcements could arrive and on the night of 2-3 October, he left Molsheim, crossed the Bruche River, and arrived at Entzheim early on the morning of 4 October. The speed of his movement took Bournonville by surprise and cut him off from Strasbourg.

Battle

Bournonville significantly outnumbered his opponent, with 35,000 men, half of which were cavalry, and 50 guns. Despite this, he decided to fight a defensive battle since Turenne had to attack immediately, or risk being caught between the Imperialists and Fredrick William, while rain and mist meant conditions favoured the defenders. Most of his infantry was in the centre, anchored on Entzheim, supported by cavalry under Charles of Lorraine. On the right, his troops were hidden from view by meadows and vineyards, leading into the Foret de Bruche. His left was protected by a ditch, running from the village to the 'Little Wood', slightly in front of his position (see Map).

The cavalry was split evenly between the two wings; the right included the elite Imperial Cuirassiers under Caprara, with the German states units commanded by the Prince de Holstein-Ploen on the left. The 'Little Wood' was key to the Imperial position, since it had to be taken in order to attack Entzheim; aware of this, Holstein-Ploen placed eight guns and six battalions of infantry in the wood itself, with another eight in reserve immediately behind.

Turenne formed his army into two lines, infantry in the centre, and cavalry on the wings, the right commanded by the Marquis de Vaubrun, the left by his nephew, Guy Aldonce de Durfort de Lorges. He stationed the grenadier companies of his infantry regiments in the gaps between his cavalry squadrons, a tactic copied from Gustavus Adolphus. His artillery was placed in front of the infantry, in four batteries of eight guns. The second line and reserve included four English regiments, known as the British Brigade, commanded by Irish Catholic George Hamilton; one of its regiments was led by John Churchill, later Duke of Marlborough. Although England had left the war, they had been encouraged to remain in French service to ensure Charles II would still be paid for them, as agreed in the 1670 Secret Treaty of Dover with Louis. 

Around 10:00 am, the French attacked the Little Wood with eight battalions of infantry, and dragoons under Louis Francois de Boufflers, a future Marshall of France. After the first assault was repulsed, they tried again, supported by four battalions from the second line, including the one commanded by Churchill. Holstein-Ploen responded by sending reinforcements from the reserve behind the wood, while heavy rain and mud impeded the French artillery as it tried to move forward; after two hours of back and forth combat, the French pulled back with heavy losses.

Of the two English units involved, one lost 11 of 22 officers, the other all its officers and over half their men; Churchill later criticised Turenne's deployment. Rather than another frontal attack, Vaubrun's cavalry tried to move around the Little Wood and take the defenders in the rear, but were repulsed by Holstein-Ploen. Simultaneously, the heavily-armed cuirassiers over-ran the French left, and the battle hung in the balance; however, the wet ground blunted the Austrian charge, and they quickly lost formation, allowing de Lorges to rally his troops, and force them back to the starting line.

Meanwhile, a third assault by the rest of Hamilton's British brigade, plus those of Puisieux and Réveillon, finally captured the Little Wood, threatening the Imperial left. After an unsuccessful attack by Vaubrun on the troops entrenched around Entzheim, Turenne ended the assaults, instead bombarding them with his artillery. By now, it was getting dark, and both sides were exhausted; having lost between 3,000 - 4,000 men, Bournonville ordered a retreat. The French had been marching or fighting for 40 hours non-stop, and their losses were about the same; aware they were incapable of making another attack, Turenne withdrew, leaving a small force of cavalry behind so that he could claim victory.

Aftermath

The Imperials entered winter quarters near Colmar, but Turenne did not pursue him; his own losses were around 3,500 men, many incurred by the British brigade, which was disbanded. He took his army north to Dettwiller between Saverne and Haguenau, where his exhausted troops could rest and refit. Entzheim was a tactical draw, but a strategic French victory; despite superior numbers, Bournonville had been prevented from entering French-held territory.

The losses suffered by the British Brigade at Entzheim, combined with restrictions imposed on recruiting by Parliament, reduced its numbers from a nominal 4,000 to less than 1,400. Churchill and other senior officers left for England, and in May 1675, Parliament ordered any men still in France to return home. Hamilton's regiment, primarily composed of Irish Catholics like himself, remained in French service throughout the war; one of his officers was Patrick Sarsfield, later a senior Jacobite commander during the 1689 to 1691 Williamite War in Ireland, who would be killed at Landen in 1693.

The campaign that started in June 1674 and ended with his death in July 1675 has been described as 'Turenne's most brilliant campaign.' Significantly outnumbered, he used stealth and boldness to fight the Imperial army to a standstill at Entzheim; with his enemy now inactive, he was able to plan the winter movement that would culminate in decisive victory at the Battle of Turckheim.

The village of Entzheim still exists, but most of the battlefield now lies beneath Strasbourg International Airport.

References

Sources
  
 
 
 
 
 
 
 
 
 
 
 
 
 
 
 
 

1674 in Europe
Battles in Grand Est
Battles involving France
Battles involving the Holy Roman Empire
Conflicts in 1674
Franco-Dutch War